Ilo Ilo (literally: "Mom and Dad Are Not Home") is a 2013 Filipino-Singaporean-Taiwanese drama film. The debut feature of director Anthony Chen, the film features an international cast, including Singaporean actor Chen Tianwen, Malaysian actress Yeo Yann Yann, Filipino actress Angeli Bayani, and debut of child actor Koh Jia Ler.

Ilo Ilo premiered at the 2013 Cannes Film Festival as part of the Directors' Fortnight on 19 May 2013. At the festival, the film was awarded the Caméra d'Or award, thus becoming the first Singaporean feature film to win an award at the Cannes Film Festival. The film was selected as the Singaporean entry for the Best Foreign Language Film at the 86th Academy Awards but was not nominated.

Plot
The movie is set in Singapore during the 1997 Asian financial crisis and centred on the Lim family as they adjust to their newly hired Filipina domestic helper, Teresa, who, like many other Filipinas, has come to Singapore in search of a better life. The father, Teck, works in sales for a glass company; the pregnant mother, Hwee Leng, works as a secretary in a shipping company that is downsizing; and the ten-year-old son, Jiale, is a troubled delinquent.

At first, Jiale and Teresa ("Terry") exhibit a troubled relationship. During a trip to the bookshop, Jiale places some unpaid merchandise in the maid's shopping bag, causing her to be accused of theft. After being scolded by Terry, tensions between them rise, resulting in Jiale climbing over the school fence at dismissal time just to avoid his maid, who comes every day to fetch him home from school. He runs home and locks her out.

When Teck loses his sales job, he conceals it from his wife and secretly smokes on the steps outside their apartment. After some time, unable to find a new job, he accepts a temporary job as a security guard monitoring an egg farm. As he continues to lose money in the stock market, in a moment of depression, he acknowledges their losses to his wife, who lambastes him over his failure. As the family's finances begin to descend deeper, familial tensions grow as Jiale continues to act out against his family and Terry. After the death of a neighbour, who had jumped from the roof of their apartment building, Jiale and Terry begin to kindle a relationship.

While Hwee Leng is desperate to stay employed as she continues to script termination letters at her job, Terry and Jiale become fast friends, sparking his mother's jealousy as their relationship develops. Feeling desperate at home and emotionally neglected by her son, Hwee Leng attends a motivational seminar, where she is moved by the optimistic words of the speaker and immediately purchases his full catalogue of motivational books and CDs. During a lunch break at work, she attempts to call the speaker but discovers the line has been disconnected and rerouted. Later that night, while watching television, she learns that the motivational speaker has been arrested for fraud, causing her to break down in the presence of her confused husband as more money is lost.

Although Jiale is a poor student and constantly in trouble, he shows high intellect and cunning in his obsessive calculation of past winning lottery numbers, which he catalogues in his schoolbook during class. One day, after being taunted by another boy that his maid only loves him because she is paid to, he pushes the boy into the bathroom wall, causing him to injure his head and bleed. Threatened with expulsion, and the school's administration unable to contact his parents, Terry arrives to plead for mercy on his behalf. After some resistance, the principal appears moved as Hwee Leng shows up, angrily dispatching Terry and berating Jiale. As Hwee Leng leaves the office with Jiale, she aggressively reminds Terry that she is Jiale's mother before snatching Jiale and walking away. As a punishment for injuring his classmate, Jiale is caned in front of the school assembly while Terry shows up, powerless to save him.

After the family car is sold for scrap, the Lim family acknowledges they can no longer afford to keep Terry employed as Teck has been recently fired from his job due to accidentally tripping over eggs while attempting to find a suspected intruder. Desperate to keep Terry, Jiale uses his savings to purchase lottery tickets but loses. He becomes tearfully despondent, cutting a lock of Terry's hair during a tense goodbye before she is sent home. Holding onto his cassette player, Jiale listens to music with his father on a bench in the hospital as Hwee Leng gives birth to a baby girl.

Cast
 Chen Tianwen as Teck, the father
 Yeo Yann Yann as Hwee Leng, the mother
 Koh Jia Ler as Jiale
 Angeli Bayani as Teresa or Terry

Production
Partially funded by Ngee Ann Polytechnic and the Singapore Film Commission, the film's budget is estimated to be around S$700,000.

Child actor Jia Ler Koh was caned for real several times in two takes while shooting a scene.

Reception
On review aggregator Rotten Tomatoes, the film has an approval rating of 100% based on 45 reviews, with an average rating of 8.0/10. The website's critics consensus reads, "Quietly compassionate and rich in detail, Ilo Ilo is a strikingly mature debut from writer-director Anthony Chen." On Metacritic, the film has a weighted average score of 85 out of 100, based on 12 critics, indicating "universal acclaim".

Ilo Ilo received positive reviews at the Cannes Film Festival. The film was later awarded the Camera d'Or award, an award which recognizes the best debut feature film in the competition. It received six nominations at the Golden Horse Film Festival and Awards., and won 4, namely  Best Film, Best New Director, Best Original Screenplay and Best Supporting Actress for Yeo Yann Yann.

Awards

Film
May 2013, Caméra d'Or, Cannes Film Festival (Cannes, France)
Sep 2013, Best Feature, 11th Pacific Meridian Film Festival (Vladivostok, Russia)
Sep 2013, NETPAC Prize, 11th Pacific Meridian Film Festival (Vladivostok, Russia)
Sep 2013, Grand Jury Prize, 10th Jameson Cinefest (Miskolc, Hungary)
Sep 2013, FIPRESCI Prize, 10th Jameson Cinefest (Miskolc, Hungary)
Sep 2013, International Ecumenical Jury Prize, 10th Jameson Cinefest (Miskolc, Hungary)
Oct 2013, Best Narrative Feature Film, 22nd Philadelphia Film Festival (Philadelphia, United States)
Oct 2013, First Feature "Sutherland Award", 57th British Film Institute London Film Festival (London, United Kingdom)
Oct 2013, Best Feature Film, Molodist Film Festival (Kyiv, Ukraine)
Oct 2013, FIPRESCI Prize, Molodist Film Festival (Kyiv, Ukraine)
Nov 2013, New Talent Award, Hong Kong Asian Film Festival (Hong Kong)
Nov 2013, Best Film, 50th Golden Horse Awards (Taipei)
Nov 2013, Piaget Best Screenplay Award (Special Award), 50th Golden Horse Awards (Taipei)
Dec 2013, Audience Award, Tokyo Filmex Film Festival (Tokyo, Japan)
Dec 2013, Best Film, Muhr AsiaAfrica Feature section, Dubai International Film Festival (Dubai, UAE)

Individual
Sep 2013, Best Actress (Yeo Yann Yann), 11th Pacific Meridian Film Festival (Vladivostok, Russia)
Sep 2013, Best Actor (Koh Jia Ler), 9th Eurasia Film Festival, (Almaty, Kazakhstan)
Oct 2013, Best Actress (Yeo Yann Yann), 15th Mumbai International Film Festival (Mumbai, India)
Oct 2013, Best Director (Anthony Chen), 15th Mumbai International Film Festival (Mumbai, India)
Nov 2013, Best Supporting Actress (Yeo Yann Yann), 50th Golden Horse Awards (Taipei, Taiwan)
Nov 2013, Best New Director (Anthony Chen), 50th Golden Horse Awards (Taipei, Taiwan)
Nov 2013, Best Original Screenplay (Anthony Chen), 50th Golden Horse Awards (Taipei, Taiwan)
Dec 2013, Best Director (Anthony Chen), 7th Asia Pacific Screen Awards (Brisbane, Australia)
Dec 2013, Best Supporting Actress (Yeo Yann Yann), Asia Pacific Film Festival (Macau)
Dec 2013, Best Actress (Yeo Yann Yann), Muhr AsiaAfrica Feature section, Dubai Film Festival (Dubai, UAE)

See also
 List of submissions to the 86th Academy Awards for Best Foreign Language Film
 List of Singaporean submissions for the Academy Award for Best Foreign Language Film

References

External links
 
 
 

 

2013 films
Singaporean drama films
Films set in 1997
Films about financial crises
Films set in Singapore
Maids in films
2010s coming-of-age drama films
2010s business films
Caméra d'Or winners
2013 directorial debut films
2013 drama films